James Meston (born 1975) is an Australian, Adelaide-based radio producer, announcer and podcaster. He has produced and co-announced the 'Arch D Radio' show on 1079 Life FM since 2011, and produced a number of series of podcasts related to Catholic education and Catholic spirituality since 2019.

From 1993 to 2017 he was a blues guitarist with the stage name "Sweet Baby James", who was named as Official Ambassador of the 2007 Australian Blues Festival. He has played onstage with Jeff Healey and Sue Foley.

In 1997, he moved to London, England, and regularly worked with David Hadley-Ray, Pete Brown and a short stint with The Big Town Playboys, filling in for regular guitarist Andy Fairweather Low while he was on tour with Eric Clapton in 1998.

Meston worked as both a trio and, from 2002, as a duo with drummer Rob Eyers in Sweet Baby James and Rob Eyers. They released a 2005 album Rhythm 'n' Blues (Black Market Music), followed in 2010 with Double Voodoo Blues.

References

Australian blues guitarists
Australian male guitarists
1975 births
Living people
Musicians from Adelaide
21st-century guitarists
21st-century Australian male musicians
21st-century Australian musicians